Holmesglen railway station is located on the Glen Waverley line in Victoria, Australia. It serves the eastern Melbourne suburb of Malvern East, and it opened on 5 May 1930.

The station is directly connected via a walkway to the adjacent Chadstone Campus of Holmesglen Institute of TAFE, with which the station shares its name.

History

Holmesglen station opened on 5 May 1930, when the railway line from East Malvern was extended to Glen Waverley. It is named after the father of Malvern Council at the time of its opening, Councillor L. W. Holmes.

In 1964, the current island platform was provided, when the line between East Malvern and Mount Waverley was duplicated. In the 1960s, the rail bridge near the station was the crime scene of an infamous Melbourne murder.

During June and early July 1991, the station was patrolled 24 hours a day by the former Victoria Transit Patrol department, working in conjunction with local police, as part of the Public Transport Corporation 'Travel Safe' program of the early 1990s.

On 26 July 2000, the station was the site of a collision involving two Comeng train sets.

On 4 May 2010, as part of the 2010/2011 State Budget, $83.7 million was allocated to upgrade Holmesglen to a Premium Station, along with nineteen others. However, in March 2011, this was scrapped by the Baillieu Government.

Platforms and services

Holmesglen has one island platform with two faces. It is serviced by Metro Trains' Glen Waverley line services.

Platform 1:
  all stations and limited express services to Flinders Street

Platform 2:
  all stations services to Glen Waverley

Transport Links

CDC Melbourne operates one route via Holmesglen station, under contract to Public Transport Victoria:
 : Kew – Oakleigh station

Kinetic Melbourne operates one SmartBus route via Holmesglen station, under contract to Public Transport Victoria:
  : Altona station – Mordialloc

Gallery

References

External links
 Melway map at street-directory.com.au

Railway stations in Melbourne
Railway stations in Australia opened in 1930
Railway stations in the City of Stonnington